The Jaipur Stakes is a Grade I American Thoroughbred horse race for horses aged three years old and older held over a distance of six furlongs on the turf scheduled annually in early June at Belmont Park in Elmont, New York.  The event currently carries a purse of $400,000.

History
The race is named after Jaipur, the Champion three-year-old colt of 1962 who ran one of the most memorable Travers Stakes on record.

The race was run at seven furlongs in 1986 to 2005, and again from 2011 to 2013. All other renewals have been at six furlongs.

For three years (1986, 1994, and 1995), it was run in two divisions.

In 2013, heavy rain forced the Jaipur to be moved from the turf to the sloppy main track. Because of the move, the stakes race lost its Grade III status for that renewal.

The event was a Grade III for most of its history but in 2019 it was upgraded to Grade I.

Records
Speed record:
6 furlongs – 1:05.67 Disco Partner (2017)  new world record
7 furlongs –  1:20.06 Nijinsky's Gold (1994) 

Margins:
 6 lengths – To Freedom (1992) 

Most wins:
 2 – Ecclesiastic (2005, 2007)
 2 – Disco Partner (2017, 2018)
 2 – Casa Creed (2021, 2022)

Most wins by an owner:
 3 – Patricia Generazio (2016, 2017, 2018)

Most wins by a jockey:
 6 – Jerry Bailey (1986, 1991, 1993, 1998, 2001, 2002)

Most wins by a trainer:
5 – William I. Mott (1989, 1998, 2006, 2021, 2022)

Winners

Legend:

 
 

Notes:

ƒ Filly or Mare

† In 2013, Big Screen was first past the post but was disqualified for interference in the stretch run and placed second. Souper Speedy was declared the winner.

See also
 List of American and Canadian Graded races

References

Horse races in New York (state)
Turf races in the United States
Grade 1 stakes races in the United States
Graded stakes races in the United States
Open sprint category horse races
Recurring sporting events established in 1984
Belmont Park
1984 establishments in New York (state)